The Corsi were an ancient people of Sardinia and Corsica, to which they gave the name, as well as one of the three major groups among which the ancient Sardinians considered themselves divided (along with the Balares and the Ilienses). Noted by Ptolemy (III, 3), they dwelt at the extreme north-east of Sardinia, in the region today known as Gallura, near the Tibulati and immediately north of the Coracenses. 

According to historian Ettore Pais and archeologist Giovanni Ugas, the Corsi probably belonged to the Ligurian people. Similar was also the opinion of Seneca, who claimed that the Corsi from Corsica, where he had then been staying in exile, were of mixed origin, resulting from the continuous mingling of various ethnic groups of foreign origin, like the Ligures, the Greeks and the Iberians. In the myth, reported by Sallust, the peopling of Corsica is traced back to Corsa, a Ligurian woman who when grazing her cattle, went to the island, which then took her name. Pausanias in the Description of Greece wrote:

See also
List of ancient Corsican and Sardinian tribes
Paleo-Corsican language
Nuragic civilization
Torrean civilization

References

Bibliography 
 
 

Ancient peoples of Sardinia